Hastula daniae is a species of sea snail, a marine gastropod mollusk in the family Terebridae, the auger snails.

Description

Distribution

References

 Aubry U. 2008. Nuove terebre dall'Angola. Malacologia Mostra Mondiale 59: 14–16
 Terryn Y. & Ryall P. (2014) West African Terebridae, with the description of a new species from the Cape Verde Islands. Conchylia 44(3–4): 27–47.

Terebridae
Gastropods described in 2008